Olli Malmivaara (born March 13, 1982) is a Finnish former professional ice hockey defenceman. He played in the National Hockey League for the New Jersey Devils.

Biography
As a youth, Malmivaara played in the 1995 Quebec International Pee-Wee Hockey Tournament with a team from Järvenpää.

He later played in Jokerit where he made his SM-liiga debut; in 2003 he signed with SaiPa and spent two years with that team. Malmivaara was drafted by the Chicago Blackhawks as their fourth-round pick, #117 overall, in the 2000 NHL Entry Draft.

In 2006, he signed with the New Jersey Devils of the National Hockey League (NHL). Malmivaara was a physical defenceman in the Finnish league, where he racked up an average of over 100 penalty minutes a season. The Devils signed him looking for defensive depth in Lowell. He played his first NHL game on October 31, 2007 against the Tampa Bay Lightning in a 6–1 win where he played just over 10 minutes. He would only play one other game in the 2007–08 NHL season, dressing for seven and a half minutes against the Toronto Maple Leafs in a 3–2 win.

As of 2013, he is playing with the Espoo Blues in the Finnish Liiga.

Malmivaara's sister Laura is an actress.

Career statistics

Regular season and playoffs

International

References

External links

1982 births
Living people
Chicago Blackhawks draft picks
Espoo Blues players
Finnish ice hockey defencemen
Jokerit players
JYP Jyväskylä players
Lowell Devils players
New Jersey Devils players
People from Kajaani
SaiPa players
Sportspeople from Kainuu